The Copa del Generalísimo 1965 Final was the 63rd final of the King's Cup. The final was played at Santiago Bernabéu in Madrid, on 4 July 1965, being won by Club Atlético de Madrid, who beat Real Zaragoza CD 1-0.

Details

References

1965
Copa
Atlético Madrid matches
Real Zaragoza matches